The 2022 USC Trojans baseball team represented the University of Southern California during the 2022 NCAA Division I baseball season. The Trojans played their home games for the 48th season at Dedeaux Field. The team was coached by Jason Gill in his 3rd season at USC.

The Trojans finished the season 25-28 with an 8-22 record in conference play, one of the worst seasons in Trojan baseball history. They finished last in the Pac-12 Conference.

Previous season 

The Trojans ended the 2021 season with a record of 13–17 in conference play and with a 25-26 overall record good for T-8th best with Washington State Cougars in the Pac-12.

Roster

Schedule

Game Summary

Rankings

External links 
 USC Trojans baseball

References 

USC
USC Trojans baseball seasons
USC Baseball